Celina Crusoe  (born ) is an Argentine female volleyball player, who played as a setter. She was part of the Argentina women's national volleyball team.

She participated at the 2002 FIVB Volleyball Women's World Championship in Germany. On club level she played with Pallavolo Reggio Emilia.

Clubs
 Pallavolo Reggio Emilia (2002)

References

External links

1974 births
Living people
Argentine women's volleyball players
Place of birth missing (living people)
Setters (volleyball)